The Charter of the Forest of 1217 is a charter that re-established for free men rights of access to the royal forest that had been eroded by King William the Conqueror and his heirs. Many of its provisions were in force for centuries afterwards. It was originally sealed in England by the young King Henry III, acting under the regency of William Marshal, 1st Earl of Pembroke. 

It was in many ways a companion document to the Magna Carta. The Charter redressed some applications of the Anglo-Norman Forest Law that had been extended and abused by King William Rufus.

History
"Forest" to the Normans meant an enclosed area where the monarch, or sometimes another aristocrat, had exclusive rights to animals of the chase and the greenery ("vert") on which they fed.  It did not consist only of trees, but included large areas of commons such as heathland, grassland and wetlands, productive of food, grazing and other resources. 

Lands became more restricted as King Richard and King John designated increasing areas as royal forest, off-limits to commoners. At its widest extent, royal forest covered about one-third of the land of southern England. Thus it became an increasing hardship on the common people to try to farm, forage, and otherwise use the land they lived on.

The Charter of the Forest was first issued on 6 November 1217 at St Paul's Cathedral, London, as a complementary charter to the Magna Carta from which it had evolved. It was reissued in 1225 with a number of minor changes to wording. It was joined with the Magna Carta in the Confirmation of Charters in 1297.
 
At a time when royal forests were the most important potential source of fuel for cooking, heating and industries such as charcoal burning, and of such hotly defended rights as pannage (pasture for their pigs), estover (collecting firewood), agistment (grazing), or turbary (cutting of turf for fuel), this charter was almost unique in providing a degree of economic protection for free men who used the forest to forage for food and to graze their animals.

In contrast to the Magna Carta, which dealt with the rights of barons, it restored to the common man some real rights, privileges and protections against the abuses of an encroaching aristocracy. For many years it was regarded as a development of great significance in England's constitutional history, with the great seventeenth-century jurist Sir Edward Coke referring to it along with Magna Carta as the Charters of England's Liberties, and Sir William Blackstone remarking in the eighteenth century that:

Contents

The first chapter of the Charter protected common pasture in the forest for all those "accustomed to it", and chapter nine provided for "every man to agist his wood in the forest as he wishes". It added "Henceforth every freeman, in his wood or on his land that he has in the forest, may with impunity make a mill, fish-preserve, pond, marl-pit, ditch, or arable in cultivated land outside coverts, provided that no injury is thereby given to any neighbour." The Charter restored the area classified as "forest" to that of Henry II's time.  

Clause 10 repealed the death penalty (and mutilation as a lesser punishment) for capturing deer (venison), though transgressors were still subject to fines or imprisonment. Special verderers' courts were set up within the forests to enforce the laws of the charter.

Development

By Tudor times, most of the laws served mainly to protect the timber in royal forests. Some clauses in the Laws of Forests remained in force until the 1970s. The special courts still exist in the New Forest and the Forest of Dean. In this respect, the Charter was the statute that remained longest in force in England from 1217 to 1971, being superseded by the Wild Creatures and Forest Laws Act 1971. 

The Charter was a vehicle for asserting the values of the commons and the right of commoners against the state and the forces of commodification. The Act that replaced it was about the protection of nature and administering the commodification of natural resources.

To mark 800 years of the Charter of the Forest, in 2017 the Woodland Trust and more than 50 other cross-sector organisations joined forces to create and launch a Charter for Trees, Woods and People, reflecting the modern relationship with trees and woods in the landscape for people in the UK.

Significance 
According to Guy Standing, the Charter "was not about the rights of the poor, but about the rights of the free. For its time and place, it was a radical assertion of the universality of freedom, its commonality."

Surviving copies

It is claimed that only two copies of the 1217 Charter of the Forest survive, belonging to Durham Cathedral and Lincoln Cathedral. The Lincoln copy is normally on display in the David P J Ross Magna Carta Vault in Lincoln Castle, together with the Lincoln copy of Magna Carta. A manuscript of the 1225 reissue narrowly escaped destruction in 1865 and is now available in the British Library (Add. Ch. 24712).

A recently discovered copy of the Charter of the Forest is in Sandwich Guildhall Museum in Kent.

In popular culture 
The Charter has inspired the name of the Read-Opera The Charter of the Forest, which deals with themes such as free people's relation to power, which were codified in one form by the original Charter of the Forest.

See also
English land law
Forestry in the United Kingdom
R v Hampden (1637) 3 Howell State Trials 825, known also as the Case of Shipmony, leading to the Ship Money Act 1640

Notes

References

GC Homans, English Villagers of the Thirteenth Century (1941)
H Rothwell, English Historical Documents 1189–1327 (1995)
P. Linebaugh, The Magna Charta Manifesto (2008)

External links

BBC Radio 4 "The Things We Forgot to Remember," Series 2 Episode 4, from 6:15 onwards

Lincoln Castle Magna Carta (and Charter of the Forest) display page

1210s in law
1217 in England
1225 in England
1297 in England
Medieval charters and cartularies of England
Medieval manuscripts
Magna Carta
Government documents
Political charters
English forest law
Henry III of England
Public commons